David West may refer to:

Sports
David Belford West (1896–1973), American football player
David West (baseball) (1964–2022), American baseball player
David West (basketball) (born 1980), American former basketball player
Dave West (Canadian football) (1928–2005), Canadian football player
David West (footballer) (born 1964), English former professional footballer
David West (soccer) (born 1967), American soccer player

Others
Dave West (entrepreneur) (1944–2014), British entrepreneur and libertarian
David West (artist) (1868–1936), Scottish watercolourist
David Paul West, British theatre and film actor
Supa Dave West, American hip-hip producer, see "Baby Phat"
David Sherman West (1885–1973), American politician from the state of Iowa